Got Talent is a British talent show TV format conceived and owned by Simon Cowell's SYCOtv company. It has spawned spin-offs in over 69 countries, in what is now referred to as the 'Got Talent' format, similar to that described by Fremantle of the Idol and The X Factor formats. Unlike those shows, Got Talent (influenced by the variety of talent shows Opportunity Knocks and New Faces) showcase other artistic disciplines in addition to singing.

In April 2014, the format was named the world's most successful reality TV format ever by Guinness World Records. Cowell said: "I am very proud that Got Talent is a homegrown British show. We owe its success to a group of very talented producers all over the world who have made this happen. And of course amazing talent."

History
Got Talent was conceived in 2005 by Simon Cowell, creator and judge on The X Factor. The format's origins can be traced to the British talent shows Opportunity Knocks (on-screen from the 1950s, with the winner using the now-standard method of a telephone vote) and New Faces. Both shows showcased singers, dancers and comedians, as well as performers such as acrobats, animal acts and novelty acts. Cowell said:"I was a fan of variety shows Opportunity Knocks and New Faces, and to be able to update that tradition, really was a buzz".

The concept of the format was for a large-scale televised talent competition where anyone, of any age and background, could participate with any form of talent before an audience and a panel of judges. The concept was first proposed to the British television network ITV, which agreed to a pilot episode of the format. When it proved a success, work began on producing a season of the competition for British television, but was suspended after its intended host had a dispute with ITV and ultimately ended their involvement. Cowell subsequently promoted the concept to American television networks sooner than planned, and secured the interest of American television network NBC to produce a season for their 2006 summer broadcast schedule.

America's Got Talent debuted on 21 June 2006, and was the first international edition of the franchise to be produced and broadcast. The programme proved a success for NBC, who commissioned further seasons, while launching the franchise internationally – among countries where television networks between late 2006 bought up the competition's format to mid-2007 included France, Russia, Sweden, and Australia. Cowell later returned to the UK to continue production of the British edition for ITV, leading to Britain's Got Talent debuting on June 9, 2007.

Proposed global version
In June 2010, following Britain's Got Talents success at the BAFTA television awards, Cowell voiced his ideas regarding World's Got Talent, a global version of Got Talent. However, he argued that the format would not work with judges as they had all "tried to be him" in previous attempts (such as World Idol), and instead proposed a commentary format, similar to that of the Eurovision Song Contest. During the same week, more details were announced, with Cowell explaining 20 previous winning contestants from global variations of Got Talent would be brought together at the Royal Albert Hall with himself and Jonathan Lopez both having roles in the show. A proposed prize of £1 million was announced a projected global television audience of 300 million, and the intended airdate of 2011.

However, Cowell halted plans for the series because it would conflict with his judging commitments with The X Factor USA and Britain's Got Talent for the years to come. In February 2014, The X Factor USA was cancelled by Fox due to low ratings and Cowell's decision to return to the UK version of that show.

In 2014, ITV first broadcast a series of spin-off shows Planet's Got Talent which showed clips of Got Talent from all over the world. It was later broadcast in Italy on TV8 and Sky Uno. Slovenia made a show as same as the British one. In 2019, Hunan Television produced an unofficial spin-off series, World's Got Talent, whose copyrights were shared by Hunan Television and Fremantle, featuring 61 notable acts from the Got Talent franchise around the world. Currently, a similar version of "World's Got Talent" and "Planet's Got Talent" acts as a YouTube channel, known as "Got Talent Global". The channel uploads clips from "Got Talent" shows worldwide. The channel currently has over 13 million subscribers. A similar channel, called Top Talent uploads clips of The X Factor, Got Talent and Idol from around the world. That channel has over 3 million subscribers.

NBC launched a spin-off series, America's Got Talent: The Champions in 2019, featuring notable contestants from America's Got Talent alongside acts from the franchises worldwide. The winner of this spin-off series was Canadian-American card magician Shin Lim. In addition, Hunan Television produced an unofficial global version of Got Talent in 2019, the World's Got Talent presented by Eliza Liang and Wong Cho-lam, featuring notable contestants from the Got Talent versions around the world. Following the success of America's Got Talent: The Champions, ITV launched a spin-off series, Britain's Got Talent: The Champions in 2019, featuring notable contestants from Britain's Got Talent alongside acts from the franchises worldwide. The winner of this spin-off series was dance act, Twist and Pulse. In 2020, Seven Network launched a spinoff series of Australia's Got Talent called Australia's Got Talent: Challengers & Champions. The show was set to launch sometime in 2020 but was cancelled before production began.

Got Talent around the world
: Franchise with a currently airing season
 Franchise with an upcoming season
 Franchise with an unknown status
 Franchise that has suspended production
 Franchise that has ended

 Notes

Got Talent Kids around the world

Got More Talent around the world

Planet's/World's Got Talent around the world

The Champions/All Stars around the world

Other spin-offs

References

 Got Talent
2006 television series debuts
 Television series by Fremantle (company)
 Reality television series franchises